Møkster is an island in Austevoll municipality in Vestland county, Norway.  The  island lies in an archipelago and it sits north of the islands of Litla Kalsøya, Stolmen, and Selbjørn; west of the islands of Drøna and Rostøya; and south of the islands of Horga, Stora Kalsøy and Hundvåko. The island had 65 inhabitants in 2001.

The island lies in the central part of the Austevoll archipelago, and as such, it was an important location for the sea-faring people who populated the region.  Møkster Church was located on the island from the middle ages until 1892 when it was torn down and the church was moved to the larger island of Stolmen (where it is still located today).

See also
List of islands of Norway

References

Islands of Vestland
Austevoll